Emamzadeh Seyyed Mohammad may refer to:
 Emamzadeh Seyyed Mohammad, Chaharmahal and Bakhtiari